Montegrotto Terme is a comune (municipality) in the Province of Padua in the Italian region Veneto, located about  west of Venice and about  southwest of Padua.

Montegrotto Terme is a  spa resort, part of the Terme Euganee spas.  The Euganean Hills (Colli Euganei) are located nearby.

Montegrotto Terme borders the following municipalities: Abano Terme, Battaglia Terme, Due Carrare, Galzignano Terme, Torreglia.

The Hotel Terme Millepini, which is a Guinness World Record holder for containing the world's deepest pool is located in Montegrotto Terme.

International relations

Twin towns – Sister cities
Montegrotto Terme is twinned with:

References

External links 
 Official website

Cities and towns in Veneto
Spa towns in Italy